Or see Outer Silver Pit, another deep place in the North Sea.
Or see silver mining.
At some point in time the Silver Pit was part of the valley of the Wash River .

Also notable is the Silverpit crater, a crater-like feature near the Silver Pit, discovered in 2002.

Origin of the Silver Pit
In origin, it is probably a tunnel valley (Benn & Evans fig.9.27) which was kept free of periglacial deposits by the Wash River when the sea level was lower, towards the end of the Devensian glaciation. However, the Silver Pit may date partially or largely from the Wolstonian Stage.

The Silver Pit (or Silver Pits) was discovered in the 19th century by trawler fishermen from the South Coast of England. They found the small valley to be rich in flatfish, especially soles in winter.

See also
 Dogger Bank for map and links to similar places
 Doggerland
 Timeline of glaciation

References

Benn, D.I. & Evans, D.J.A. Glaciers and Glaciation (1998) 
Cameron, Crosby, Balson, Jeffery, Lott, Bulat & Harrison. The Geology of the Southern North Sea (1992) 
Glennie, K.W. Lower Permian - Rotliegend in ed. Glennie Introduction to the Petroleum Geology of the North Sea. (1990) 
Imray, Laurie, Norie & Wilson pub. East Coast of England: Orfordness to Blythe marine chart (1980)

External links
Silver Pit chart The Outer Silver Pit is further to the north-east, at the eastern end of the Skate Hole.
Outer Silver Pit chart It lies between the Dogger Bank and the Norfolk to Friesland ridge.

Landforms of the North Sea